was a Japanese volleyball player. Her name before her divorce was Ai Yamamoto (山本 愛).

Career 

She competed at the 2004 Summer Olympics in Athens, Greece, wearing the number #13 jersey. She took fifth place with the Japan women's national team. She played as a middle-blocker.

In 2006, she was two months pregnant when she married Tatsuo Yamamoto, a professional beach volleyball player.

In 2008, Hisamitsu Springs announced that she would return to active duty.

In 2009, she moved to JT Marvelous.

In September 2011, due to a right knee injury, Japan Volleyball Association announced that she would not play in the World Cup.

At the 2012 Summer Olympics, she was part of the Japanese team that won the bronze medal in indoor women's volleyball.

In April 2013 JT Marvelous announced her retirement.

On 8 August 2013, Ai married Hiroyuki Akimoto who is a Judoka.

Clubs 
SendaiIkuei High School
NEC Red Rockets (2000–2006)
Hisamitsu Springs (2008–2009)
JT Marvelous (2009–2013)

Awards

Individual 
1999 Asian Youth Championship – Best server award
2000 Asian Junior Championship – Server award
2001 2000–01 V.Premier League – New face award
2002 51st Kurowashiki All Japan Volleyball Championship – Best6
2005 54th Kurowashiki All Japan Volleyball Championship – Best6
2009 58th Kurowashiki All Japan Volleyball Tournament – Best6
2010 2009–10 V.Premier League – Best 6
2010 59th Kurowashiki All Japan Volleyball Tournament – Best6
2011 2010–11 V.Premier League – Best 6
2011 60th Kurowashiki All Japan Volleyball Tournament – MVP, Best6
2013 62nd Kurowashiki All Japan Volleyball Tournament – Best 6

Team 
2001 Kurowashiki All Japan Volleyball Championship –  Champion, with NEC Red Rockets
2002 8th V.League –  Runner-Up, with NEC Red Rockets
2003 9th V.League –  Champion, with NEC Red Rockets
2004 10th V.League –  Champion, with NEC Red Rockets
2008–09 V.Premier League –  Runner-Up, with Hisamitsu Springs
2009 58th Kurowashiki All Japan Volleyball Tournament –  Runner-Up, with Hisamistu Springa
2009–10 V.Premier League –  Runner-Up, with JT Marvelous
2010 59th Kurowashiki All Japan Volleyball Tournament –  Runner-Up, with JT Marvelous
2010–11 V.Premier League –  Champion, with JT Marvelous
2011 60th Kurowashiki All Japan Volleyball Tournament –  Champion, with JT Marvelous

National team

Senior team 
2002 World Championship – 13th place
2004 Summer Olympics – 5th place
2010 World Championship – Bronze medal
2011 Montreux Volley Masters –  Champion
2012:  Bronze Medal in the Olympic Games of London

Junior team 
2000 World Youth Championship –  Champion

References

External links
 FIVB biography

1982 births
Living people
Volleyball players at the 2004 Summer Olympics
Olympic volleyball players of Japan
Sportspeople from Sendai
NEC Red Rockets players
Volleyball players at the 2012 Summer Olympics
Olympic bronze medalists for Japan
Olympic medalists in volleyball
Japanese women's volleyball players
Medalists at the 2012 Summer Olympics
Asian Games medalists in volleyball
Volleyball players at the 2002 Asian Games
Asian Games bronze medalists for Japan
Medalists at the 2002 Asian Games